Survie (French for "survival") is a non-governmental organization (NGO) founded in 1984 to fight hunger and corruption in the Third World. It has since become a federation of departmental associations, composed of 1,600 paying members, about a 100 activists and six employees. In September 2005, Odile Tobner became president of Survie, a post previously held by François-Xavier Verschave, famous for his criticisms of French neocolonialism in African former colonies and his neologism Françafrique.

Brief history

Origin

Survie was founded in 1984 as a consequence of the 1981 Manifesto Appeal of the Nobel Prizewinners against hunger, written by Nobel laureate Adolfo Pérez Esquivel, French engineer Jean Fabre and the founder of the Italian Radical Party Marco Pannella.  The Manifesto Appeal was signed originally by 55 Nobel laureates (123 Nobel laureates had signed it by 1996). To promote the Manifesto Appeal, an international NGO was founded in Bruxelles, Food and Disarmament International, while Survie was launched in Belgium and Italy, drawing tens of thousands of people.

Survival acts

In 1983, after the involvement of several Belgian mayors and a hunger strike spontaneously initiated by a blind man, the Belgian Parliament unanimously voted for a "Survival Act", which accorded 10 billion Belgian francs (1.6 billion French francs) to development aid in East Africa.

In 1984, more than 8,000 French mayors were members of Survie, while the next year the Italian Parliament passed a Survival Act according 9 billion French francs to an 18-month program in countries severely affected by hunger and decertification. Previously the French Parliament had failed to pass legislation similar to the Belgian and Italian Acts, however, Survie focused on lobbying deputies (MPs) instead of mayors. In the March 1993 Parliament, 319 MPs, along with the Prime minister, the Minister of Economics, the Foreign Affairs minister and the Cooperation minister, signed the proposal for a Survival Act. The Bill was conceived in 1989 by 5 MPs from all five groups of the French Parliament (French Communist Party, French Socialist Party, and the conservative Union for French Democracy, Rally for the Republic, and UDC). It provided .001 percent of the French national budget (6 billion French francs per year) to aid development, to be delivered according to a new institutional model, giving a key role to civil society.

During this campaign, Survie recognized the extent of the corruption affecting public aid development, which it dubbed "secret aid to counter-development", arguing that this aid was a main instrument of the neocolonialist Françafrique as it fostered support for various dictators in former French colonies.

Rwandan genocide

The Rwandan genocide was a shock for many people, as it pointed to the dark side of France's links with former colonies (the bright side of which is formed by the official Francophonie organization). François-Xavier Verschave, at the time the president of Survie, wrote several books criticizing the French state's involvement in Rwanda and alleging that some French elements took part, in a way or another, in that genocide. All French forces left in December 1993 at the insistence of the RPF. They only returned during Operation Amaryllis which evacuated expatriates during the first days of the genocide, and in the UN Operation Turquoise which successfully saved civilians including Tutsis from harm. A Mission d'information parlementaire sur le Rwanda (Parliamentary Information Mission on Rwanda) was created following several newsarticles by Le Figaro.  Survie preferred the creation of a Parliamentary Investigation Commission. Survie has not adapted its position to match the evidence brought out in the ICTR trials.

Comoros

Survie opposes the French presence in Mayotte, a French overseas territory Collectivité d'outre-mer, and supports its integration into the Union of the Comoros. The NGO claims that the referendum through which the Mayotte population chose to remain under French sovereignty was illegal. If the reintegration of Mayotte with the Comoros Islands cannot be achieved, the NGO advocates an exceptional migrant status for the inhabitants of Mayotte—the Mahorais—which would remove the requirement for visas between the Comores and Mayotte.

Relationship with other organizations

Survie founded several NGOs, including ATTAC, Biens Publics à l'Echelle Mondiale and the Observatoire de la Coopération Française. It is also a member of the Center for research and information about development, the Citizen Commission of Investigation on the Implication of France in Rwanda, and the Coalition des ONG pour la Cour Pénale Internationale (NGO coalition for the International Criminal Court).

References

External links
Official website

Anti-globalization activists
Non-profit organizations based in France
Neocolonialism
French colonial empire
Politics of France
Politics of Rwanda
Poverty-related organizations
Hunger relief organizations